St. Vincent Hospital is a hospital in Indianapolis, Indiana, US. It is the flagship installation of St. Vincent Health which operates 22 facilities over 46 Indiana counties and is one of the largest ministries in the Catholic health care organization Ascension.

History
Driven by the faith of four Daughters of Charity who arrived in Indianapolis in 1881 with $34.77 in their pockets, St. Vincent was built in 1974. The hospital has grown to include six "Centers of Excellence": Women's, Children's, Orthopedics, Cardiovascular, Neuroscience and Cancer Care.

Peyton Manning Children's Hospital at St. Vincent
Built in 2004, Peyton Manning Children's Hospital at St. Vincent has more than 300 pediatric specialists, 46 private inpatient rooms, 15 private rooms in the Pediatric Intensive Care Unit and 17 private rooms in the Hilbert Pediatric Emergency Department – the first pediatric emergency room in Indiana.

The pediatric specialists and clinical staff at the children's hospital provide care in emergency medicine, cancer and blood diseases, general surgery, cardiology, orthopedics, pulmonology, otolaryngology, rehabilitation and endocrinology.

Since 1998, former NFL quarterback Peyton Manning has had a public and private relationship with St. Vincent. On September 5, 2007, Manning partnered with St. Vincent to announce the renaming of St. Vincent Children's Hospital to Peyton Manning Children's Hospital at St. Vincent.

See also
List of hospitals in Indianapolis
List of stroke centers in the United States
List of trauma centers in the United States
List of children's hospitals in the United States

References

External links
 www.stvincent.org

Hospital buildings completed in 1913
Catholic hospitals in North America
Hospitals in Indiana
Healthcare in Indianapolis
1881 establishments in Indiana
Trauma centers